Brora Y Station was a Government listening station located South-east of Brora in Sutherland, Scotland which operated between 1940 and 1986.

History
The building was built for the General Post Office and completed by 1939. During the Second World War it operated as a Y-station, collecting information for analysts at Bletchley Park. Unlike other Y stations Brora did not close after the War but continued as a Cold War monitoring station under the aegis of Government Communications Headquarters (GCHQ) until it closed in 1986.

References

Brora
Buildings and structures in Sutherland
GCHQ buildings and structures
Y service
1939 establishments in Scotland